Sredets Municipality (Bulgarian: Община Средец, Obshtina Sredets) is a municipality in Burgas Province, Bulgaria. It includes the town of Sredets and 31 villages.

Demographics

Religion 
According to the latest Bulgarian census of 2011, the religious composition, among those who answered the optional question on religious identification, was the following:

References

External links

 

Municipalities in Burgas Province